Farrington is an unincorporated community in Franklin County, in the U.S. state of Washington.

The community was named after R. I. Farrington, a railroad official.

References

Unincorporated communities in Franklin County, Washington
Unincorporated communities in Washington (state)